O'Brien County is a county in the U.S. state of Iowa. As of the 2020 United States Census, the population was 14,182. The county seat is Primghar.

History
By the time Iowa attained statehood (28 December 1848), its Territorial Legislature had created 44 counties. On 15 January 1851 the new State Legislature created another 49 counties, defining them by lines of survey. O'Brien was among the 49 units thus created. It consists of four survey townships, each formed by 36 square miles arranged in a 6x6 layout, for a nominal 576 square miles total area. The county was named for William Smith O'Brien, a leader for Irish independence in 1848.

The new county's first settler arrived in 1856; Hannibal H. Waterman brought his wife and a daughter to the southeast portion (present Waterman Township). His homestead formed the nucleus of the county's first community, and a small building was erected there to function as a courthouse.

By 1872 the county comprised several small communities, and residents of those groups felt the county's business should be conducted in a more central location. An election was held, the outcome of which was to create a new county seat at its midpoint. A 40-acre (16.2 hectare) tract at the center of the county was surveyed and platted; its name (Primghar) was created from the initials of eight persons involved with the platting. The previous courthouse building was transported to this new location.

In 1874 a 35-foot square building was erected on the present location at a cost of $2,000, to replace the first structure. It was replaced in 1887 by a larger structure. The County Board of Supervisors authorized its construction, at a cost not to exceed $5,000 (the maximum amount the County was authorized to commit). To keep within this limit, members of the new community agreed to haul the building materials without charge from railroad stops at Sanborn and Paullina. The present courthouse was completed in 1917, and is listed on the National Register of Historic Places.

Geography

Major highways

  U.S. Highway 18
  U.S. Highway 59
  Iowa Highway 10
  Iowa Highway 60
  Iowa Highway 143

Adjacent counties
 Osceola County - north
 Clay County - east
 Cherokee County - south
 Sioux County - west

Demographics

2020 census
There were 6,524 housing units, of which 5,861 were occupied.

2010 census
As of the 2010 United States Census, there were 14,398 people, 6,069 households, and 3,927 families in the county. There were 6,649 housing units at an average density of 11 per square mile (4/km2). The racial makeup of the county was 96.0% White, 0.5% Black or African American, 0.1% American Indian, 0.6% Asian, 2.0% from other races, and 0.8% from two or more races. The county has a 3.8% Hispanic or Latino background.

There were 6,069 households, out of which 26.0% had children under the age of 18 living with them, 55.1% were married couples living together, 6.1% had a female householder with no husband present, 3.5% had a male householder with no wife present, and 35.3% were non-families. 31.5% of all households were made up of individuals living alone, and 33.1% had someone living alone who was 65 years of age or older. The average household size was 2.31 and the average family size was 2.89.

The county population contained 25.7% under the age of 20, 4.6% from 20 to 24, 21.3% from 25 to 44, 28.1% from 45 to 64, and 20.4% who were 65 years of age or older. The median age was 43.6 years. For every 100 females there were 95.80 males. For every 100 females, there were 99.1 males.

The median income for a household in the county was $44,018, and the median income for a family was $58,127. The per capita income for the county was $24,771.  About 6.3% of families and 11.0% of the population were below the poverty line, including 15.7% of those under age 18 and 8.3% of those age 65 or over.

Communities

Cities

 Archer
 Calumet
 Hartley
 Paullina
 Primghar
 Sanborn
 Sheldon
 Sutherland

Unincorporated communities
 Gaza
 Germantown
 Moneta

Townships

 Baker Township
 Caledonia Township
 Carroll Township
 Center Township
 Dale Township
 Floyd Township
 Franklin Township
 Grant Township
 Hartley Township
 Highland Township
 Liberty Township
 Lincoln Township
 Omega Township
 Summit Township
 Union Township
 Waterman Township

Population ranking
The population ranking of the following table is based on the 2020 census of O'Brien County.

† county seat

Politics

See also

 National Register of Historic Places listings in O'Brien County, Iowa
 Indian Village Site in the Witrock Area

References

External links

 O'Brien County Portal style website, Government, Business, Tourism and more
 IaGenWeb O'Brien county history, Biographies, and more
 City-Data Comprehensive Statistical Data and more about O'Brien County

 
1851 establishments in Iowa
Populated places established in 1851